Mount Stimson is the second highest peak in Glacier National Park, located in Montana, United States. It is part of the Lewis Range, which spans much of the park. It is drained by Pinchot Creek (on the south) and Nyack Creek (on the other sides), both of which flow into the Middle Fork of the Flathead River.
The mountain is named for Henry L. Stimson (1867–1950), former U.S. Secretary of State and twice Secretary of War, who hiked and assisted George Bird Grinnell survey the area in and around Glacier National Park in the 1890s, and supported efforts to establish the national park.

Notability
Mount Stimson is notable for its large, steep rise above local terrain. This makes it "truly a monster of a mountain." It is also notable for its isolation; it is one of the farthest peaks from a roadhead in the park.

History
The first recorded ascent of Mount Stimson was in 1951, by J. Gordon Edwards and Alice Edwards; however they found clear evidence of a previous ascent. The standard route of ascent is the West or Northwest Face Route, starting from Nyack Creek. A backpacking trail runs along Nyack Creek, providing access; however the National Park Service warns that this is a more brushy and isolated trail than in other areas of the park, with numerous unbridged stream crossings.  As in the rest of the park, grizzly bears are an issue as well. The climbing route begins with "tiresome uphill bushwhacking...for possibly three hours" leading to alternating slopes and cliffs (Grades 3 and 4). Other routes on the peak include the Southeast Spur from Martha's Basin and the Pinchot Creek Route from the south.

See also
 Mountains and mountain ranges of Glacier National Park (U.S.)

References

External links
 Mt. Stimson photo: Flickr

Mountains of Flathead County, Montana
Mountains of Glacier National Park (U.S.)
Lewis Range
Mountains of Montana